Sebastian Elney (born 26 June 1997) is a professional footballer who plays as a forward. Born in the United States, Elney represents the Haiti national team.

Career

Youth
Eleny grew up in Boca Raton, Florida and played with Boca United. In 2015 he played for the Philadelphia Union Academy.  He attended the University of Maryland, College Park and played for the Maryland Terrapins for four seasons, winning the National Championship in his last season.

New York Red Bulls II
On 8 March 2019, Elney signed his first professional contract with New York Red Bulls II. On 9 March 2019, he made his debut with the club, appearing  in a 3–1 victory over Swope Park Rangers. He was released by Red Bulls II on 30 November 2020.

Hartford Athletic
On 25 February 2021, Elney signed with Hartford Athletic.

International career
Elney played for several Team USA youth national teams before changing his national team affiliation to Hati in 2021, he was on Haiti's preliminary roster for 2021 Olympic qualifiers but did not appear in a game. Elney debuted with the Haiti national team in a friendly 5–1 loss to Bahrain on 1 September 2021.

References

External links

Profile at UMD Athletics

1997 births
Living people
Sportspeople from Boca Raton, Florida
Soccer players from Florida
Haitian footballers
Haiti international footballers
American soccer players
United States men's youth international soccer players
Citizens of Haiti through descent
Association football forwards
Maryland Terrapins men's soccer players
New York Red Bulls II players
Hartford Athletic players
USL Championship players
American sportspeople of Haitian descent
African-American soccer players